Coris is a plant genus in the family Primulaceae.

References

External links

Primulaceae
Primulaceae genera